The Hubballi – Lokmanya Tilak Terminus Express is an Express train belonging to South Western Railway zone that runs between Hubballi Junction and Lokmanya Tilak Terminus in India. It is currently being operated with 17321/17322 train numbers on a weekly basis. The train is shut down due to poor patronage w.e.f. 5 October 2019.

Service

The 17321/Hubballi - Mumbai LTT Weekly Express has an average speed of 43 km/hr and covers 790 km in 18h 25m. The 17322/Mumbai LTT - Hubballi Weekly Express has an average speed of 39 km/hr and covers 790 km in 18h 25m.

Route and halts 

The important halts of the train are:

Coach composite

The train has standard ICF rakes with a max speed of 110 kmph. The train consists of 16 coaches :

 1 AC II Tier
 1 AC III Tier
 6 Sleeper Coaches
 6 General Unreserved
 2 Seating cum Luggage Rake

Traction

Both trains are hauled by a Krishnarajapuram Loco Shed or Hubballi Loco Shed based twins WDM 3A diesel locomotive from Hubballi to Kurla and vice versa.

Rake Sharing 

The train shares its rake with 12777/12778 Hubballi - Kochuveli Superfast Express.

Direction Reversal

Train Reverses its direction 1 times:

Notes

See also 

 Hubli Junction railway station
 Lokmanya Tilak Terminus railway station
 Hubballi – Lokmanya Tilak Terminus Express
 Hubballi - Kochuveli Superfast Express

References

External links 

 17321/Hubballi - Mumbai LTT Weekly Express
 17322/Mumbai LTT - Hubballi Weekly Express

Transport in Mumbai
Transport in Hubli-Dharwad
Rail transport in Maharashtra
Rail transport in Karnataka
Express trains in India
Railway services introduced in 2014